Aying is a municipality in the district of Munich in Bavaria, Germany. It is known for the Ayinger Brewery.

Gallery

References

Munich (district)